Abeid Amani Karume (4 August 1905 – 7 April 1972) was the first President of Zanzibar. Three months later, the United Republic of Tanzania was founded, and Karume became the first Vice President of the United Republic with Julius Nyerere of Tanganyika as president of the new country. He was the father of Zanzibar's former president, Amani Abeid Karume.

Early career
Allegedly born at the village of Mwera, Zanzibar in 1905, Karume had little formal education and worked as a seaman before entering politics. He once proudly served as an oarsman for the Sultan's ceremonial barge. He left Zanzibar in the early years of his life, travelling among other places to London, where he gained an understanding of geopolitics and international affairs through exposure to African thinkers such as Hastings Kamuzu Banda of Malawi. Karume developed an apparatus of control through the expansion of the Afro-Shirazi Party and its relations with the Tanganyika African National Union party.

Revolution in Zanzibar

On 10 December 1963, the United Kingdom granted full independence to Zanzibar after the Zanzibar National Party (ZNP) and Zanzibar and Pemba People's Party won the elections. The Sultan was a constitutional monarch. Initial elections gave government control to the ZNP. Karume was willing to work within the electoral framework of the new government, and actually informed a British police officer of the revolutionary plot set to take place in January.

Karume was not in Zanzibar on 12 January 1964, the night of the revolution, and was instead on the African mainland. The instigator of the rebellion was a previously unknown Ugandan, John Okello. 2,000 - 4,000 Zanzibaris, mostly Zanzibari Arabs & Indians, were murdered, with relatively few casualties on the revolutionary side. Many more were raped and images of mass-killings and mass-graves invocative of genocidal episodes were published in the world media causing immediate alarm and embarrassing the Nyerere Government. The Zanzibar Revolution brought an end to about 500 years of Arab domination on the island during which the Arab Slave Trade, most significantly, had resulted in a strong resentment among the majority African population.

Power struggle

Having taken control of the island, John Okello invited Abeid Karume back to the island to assume the title of President of the People's Republic of Zanzibar. Other Zanzibaris in foreign territory were also invited back, most notably the Marxist politician Abdulrahman Mohammad Babu, who was appointed to the Revolutionary Council. John Okello reserved for himself the title of "Field Marshal", a position with undefined power. What followed was a three-month-long internal struggle for power. 

Karume used his political skills to align the leaders of neighboring African countries against Okello and invited Tanganyikan police officers into Zanzibar to maintain order. As soon as Okello took a trip out of the country, Karume declared him an "enemy of the state" and did not allow him to return. Given the presence of Tanganyikan police and the absence of their leader, Okello's gangs of followers did not offer any resistance.

The union ensured that the new country, to be called Tanzania, would not align itself with the Soviet Union and communist bloc, as A.M. Babu had advocated. Given the new legitimacy of Karume's government (now solidly backed up by mainland Tanganyika), Karume marginalized Babu to the point of irrelevance. The Marxist leader was eventually forced to flee Tanzania after being charged with masterminding the assassination of Karume in 1972. As a result, Karume was rewarded the post of First Vice-President.

Personal life 
In 1970, four young Persian girls refused to marry 64 years old Karume. As a result, he ordered the arrest of 10 of their male relatives for "hindering the implementation of mixed marriages." He threatened to deport these men and dozens of other members of the Persian Ithnasheri sect to which they belonged. Because of Tanzanian President Nyerere's pressure, Karume eventually dropped the charges. However, a few months later, the 4 different Persian girls were forced to marry members of his Revolutionary Council and 11 of the girls' relatives afterwards were ordered by a judge to be imprisoned and flogged.

Karume remarked on the situation: "In colonial times the Arabs took African concubines without bothering to marry them. Now that we are in power, the shoe is on the other foot."

Assassination and legacy

Four gunmen shot him dead as he played bao at the headquarters of the Afro-Shirazi Party. Reprisals followed against people suspected to have been opposed to Karume's regime. During his tenure he was able to nationalize land owned by Arabs and Indians and re-distribute the land among the poor majority Zanzibaris. He also established a system of free education and health services for all Zanzibaris regardless their race, color or ethnicity. Apart from that, he engaged in construction of many houses available to the people of Zanzibar a very affordable rents. Amani Abeid Karume, Abeid's son, was elected two times as the president of Zanzibar, in 2000 and 2005 by a popular majority and handed over power in late 2010 to his successor Ali Mohamed Shein.

See also
Njenga Karume
Godfrey Mwakikagile

References

1905 births
1972 deaths
Presidents of Zanzibar
Swahili people
Vice-presidents of Tanzania
Afro-Shirazi Party politicians
Assassinated Tanzanian politicians
People murdered in Tanzania
Deaths by firearm in Tanzania
Tanzanian Muslims
Heads of state of former countries
1972 in Tanzania
1972 crimes in Tanzania
1972 murders in Africa
1970s murders in Tanzania